Aybar Bolatuly Zhaksylykov (Aibar Bolatūly Jaqsylyqov; born 24 July 1997) is a Kazakhstani footballer who plays as a forward for Zhetysu.

Club career
Zhaksylykov made his professional debut for Zhetysu in the Kazakhstan Premier League on 9 March 2019, coming on as a substitute in the 85th minute for Ivaylo Dimitrov against Okzhetpes. Two minutes later Zhaksylykov scored for Zhetysu, with the match finishing as a 5–1 home win.

International career
Zhaksylykov made his international debut for Kazakhstan on 11 October 2020 in the UEFA Nations League, coming on as a substitute in the 86th minute for Baktiyar Zaynutdinov against Albania. The home match finished as a 0–0 draw.

Career statistics

International

References

External links
 

1997 births
Living people
People from Almaty Region
Kazakhstani footballers
Kazakhstan international footballers
Association football forwards
FC Zhetysu players
Kazakhstan Premier League players
Kazakhstan First Division players